Betty Ann (née Southwick) Keegan (January 23, 1920 – April 16, 1974) was an American politician.

Born in Springfield, Illinois, she received her bachelor's degree from Rockford College and did graduate work from University of Wisconsin. She was active in the Democratic Party and lived in Rockford, Illinois. Keegan served in the 6th Illinois Constitutional Convention of 1969. In 1972, she was elected to the Illinois State Senate. Keegan died of cancer in Rockford, Illinois.

Notes

1920 births
1974 deaths
Politicians from Springfield, Illinois
Politicians from Rockford, Illinois
Rockford University alumni
University of Wisconsin–Madison alumni
Women state legislators in Illinois
Democratic Party Illinois state senators
20th-century American politicians
20th-century American women politicians
Deaths from cancer in Illinois